Aranda may refer to:

Places
 Aranda, Australian Capital Territory, a suburb in Canberra, Australia, named after the Arrernte or Aranda Indigenous people 
 Aranda (comarca), a comarca (county) in Aragon, Spain
 Aranda de Duero, Burgos province, Spain
 Aranda de Moncayo, Zaragoza, Aragon, Spain

Ships
 Aranda, a 1953-built Finnish research ship now known as Katarina (1953 ship)
 Aranda (1989 ship), a research vessel owned by the Finnish Environment Institute

Other uses
 Aranda (band), a rock band from Oklahoma City, Oklahoma
 Aranda (album), a 2008 studio album by the titular American rock group
 Aranda (surname)
 × Aranda, a hybrid genus of orchids
 Arrernte people, an Aboriginal Australian people often spelt Aranda
Arrernte language, dialect cluster spoken by some Arrernte people

See also
 Arandas (disambiguation)